Neurofibromatosis (NF) is a group of three conditions in which tumors grow in the nervous system. The three types are neurofibromatosis type I (NF1), neurofibromatosis type II (NF2), and schwannomatosis. In NF1 symptoms include light brown spots on the skin, freckles in the armpit and groin, small bumps within nerves, and scoliosis. In NF2, there may be hearing loss, cataracts at a young age, balance problems, flesh colored skin flaps, and muscle wasting. In schwannomatosis there may be pain either in one location or in wide areas of the body. The tumors in NF are generally non-cancerous.

The cause is a genetic mutation in certain oncogenes. These can be inherited, or in about half of cases spontaneously occur during early development. Different mutations result in the three types of NF. Neurofibromatosis arise from the supporting cells of the nervous system rather than the neurons themselves. In NF1, the tumors are neurofibromas (tumors of the peripheral nerves), while in NF2 and schwannomatosis tumors of Schwann cells are more common. Diagnosis is typically based on symptoms, examination, medical imaging, and biopsy. Genetic testing may rarely be done to support the diagnosis.

There is no known prevention or cure. Surgery may be done to remove tumors that are causing problems or have become cancerous. Radiation and chemotherapy may also be used if cancer occurs. A cochlear implant or auditory brainstem implant may help some who have hearing loss due to the condition.

In the United States, about 1 in 3,500 people have NF1 and 1 in 25,000 have NF2. Males and females are affected equally often. In NF1, symptoms are often present at birth or develop before 10 years of age. While the condition typically worsens with time, most people with NF1 have a normal life expectancy. In NF2, symptoms may not become apparent until early adulthood. NF2 increases the risk of early death. Descriptions of the condition occur as far back as the 1st century. It was formally described by Friedrich Daniel von Recklinghausen in 1882, after whom it was previously named.

Signs and symptoms 

Neurofibromatosis type 1 in early life may cause learning and behavior problems – about 60% of children who have NF1 have mild difficulty in school. Signs the individual might have are as follows:
 Six or more light brown dermatological spots ("café au lait spots")
 At least two neurofibromas
 At least two growths on the eye's iris
 Abnormal growth of the spine (scoliosis)

People with neurofibromatosis type 2 can exhibit the same type of skin symptoms as type 1, but not necessarily in every case. The symptom most characteristic of NF2 is hearing loss. The hearing loss occurs due to the pressure of tumors on the acoustic nerve. The same pressure can cause headaches, dizziness, and nausea.

The main symptom of schwannomatosis is localized pain. This pain is due to tissues and nerves experiencing more pressure because of nearby tumors.

Cause

The three types of Neurofibromatosis are caused by different mutations on chromosomes. NF1 is caused by a mutation on the NF1 gene on the arm of chromosome 17. NF2 is caused by a mutation on the NF2 tumor suppressor gene on chromosome 22. Schwannomatosis is caused by various mutations on chromosome 22.

Neurofibromatosis is an autosomal dominant disorder, which means only one copy of the affected gene is needed for the disorder to develop. If one parent has neurofibromatosis, his or her children have a 50% chance of developing the condition as well. The severity of the parent's condition does not affect the child; the affected child may have mild NF1 even though it was inherited from a parent with a severe form of the disorder. The types of neurofibromatosis are:
 Neurofibromatosis type I, in which the nerve tissue grows tumors (neurofibromas) that may be benign, but may cause serious damage by compressing nerves and other tissues.
 Neurofibromatosis type II, in which bilateral acoustic neuromas (tumors of the vestibulocochlear nerve or cranial nerve 8 (CN VIII) also known as schwannoma) develop, often leading to hearing loss.
 Schwannomatosis, in which painful schwannomas develop on spinal and peripheral nerves.

Pathophysiology
Neurofibromatosis type I is caused by a mutation on chromosome 17 encoding a cytoplasmic protein known as neurofibromin. This protein is a tumor suppressor and therefore serves as a signal regulator of cell proliferation and differentiation. A dysfunction or lack of neurofibromin can affect regulation, and cause uncontrolled cell proliferation, leading to the tumors (neurofibromas) that characterize NF1. The neurofibromas caused by NF consist of Schwann cells, fibroblasts, perineuronal cells, mast cells and axons embedded in an extracellular matrix. Another function of neurofibromin is to bind to microtubules that play a role in the release of adenylyl cyclase and its activity. Adenylyl cyclase plays an essential role in cognition. Neurofibromin's role in the activity of adenylyl cyclase explains why patients with NF experience cognitive impairment.

Neurofibromatosis type II is caused by a mutation on chromosome 22. The mutation falls on the NF2 tumor suppressor gene. The gene normally encodes a cytoplasmic protein known as merlin. The normal function of merlin is to regulate the activity of multiple growth factors, the mutated copy of the gene leads to merlin's loss of function. The loss of function leads to increased activity of growth factors normally regulated by merlin, leading to the formation of the tumors associated with NF2.

Schwannomatosis is caused by a mutation on the SMARCB1 gene. This gene is located near the NF2 tumor suppressor gene leading to the thought that schwannomatosis and NF2 were the same condition. The two conditions show different mutations on two different genes. The normal function of the SMARCB1 gene is to encode a protein called SMARCB1 that is part of a larger protein complex whose function is not completely understood. The complex including SMARCB1 plays a role in tumor suppression. The mutation of the SMARCB1 gene causes a loss of function in the complex leading to the formation of tumors indicative of schwannomatosis.

Diagnosis

The neurofibromatoses are considered as RASopathies and as members of the neurocutaneous syndromes (phakomatoses).
The diagnosis of neurofibromatosis is done via the following means:

Differential diagnosis
Conditions similar to NF include:

Treatment
Surgical removal of tumors is an option; however, the risks involved should be assessed first. With regard to OPG (optic pathway gliomas), the preferred treatment is chemotherapy. However, radiotherapy is not recommended in children who present with this disorder. It is recommended that children diagnosed with NF1 at an early age have an examination each year, which allows any potential growths or changes related to the disorder to be monitored.

Prognosis
In most cases, symptoms of NF1 are mild, and individuals live normal and productive lives. In some cases, however, NF1 can be severely debilitating and may cause cosmetic and psychological issues. The course of NF2 varies greatly among individuals.  In some cases of NF2, the damage to nearby vital structures, such as other cranial nerves and the brain stem, can be life-threatening.  Most individuals with schwannomatosis have significant pain.  In some extreme cases, the pain will be severe and disabling.

Epidemiology
In the United States, about 1 in 3,500 people have NF1, 1 in 25,000 have NF2, and 1 in 40,000 have schwannomatosis. Males and females are affected equally often in all three conditions. In NF1, symptoms are often present at birth or develop before 10 years of age. While the condition typically worsens with time, most people with NF1 have a normal life expectancy. In NF2, symptoms may not become apparent until early adulthood. NF2 increases the risk of early death. Schwannomatosis symptoms develop in early childhood and can worsen with time. Typically life expectancy is unaffected in those with schwannomatosis.

History
Descriptions of what is believed to be the condition go as far back as the 1st century. The conditions were formally described by Friedrich Daniel von Recklinghausen in 1882, after whom it was previously named.

References

Further reading

External links 

 National Institute of Neurological Disorders and Stroke - information on Neurofibromatosis

Genodermatoses
PNS neoplasia
Wikipedia medicine articles ready to translate